The Hazard Farmstead (Joyner Site RI-706) (also known as Joyner Archeological Site RI-706) is a historic archaeological site in Jamestown, Rhode Island.  It is the location of a major American Indian settlement whose artifacts have been dated from 2,500 BC to 1,000 AD.  It appeared to be occupied seasonally from late summer to fall, and was intensively used during those times.

The site was added to the National Register of Historic Places in 1984. It was negatively affected by road work associated with the construction of the Jamestown Verrazzano Bridge and changes to Rhode Island Route 138, although data was recovered from the site by salvage archaeology first.

See also
National Register of Historic Places listings in Newport County, Rhode Island

References

Archaeological sites in Rhode Island
Archaeological sites on the National Register of Historic Places in Rhode Island
Jamestown, Rhode Island
National Register of Historic Places in Newport County, Rhode Island